The Portuguese Socialist Party was a political party in Portugal.

The party was founded in 1875. During its initial phase the party was heavily influenced by Proudhonism, and rejected revolutionary Marxism. The party suffered constant factional struggles. In 1919 the leftwing of the party broke away (that group would merge with anarcho-syndicalists to form the Portuguese Maximalist Federation, which became the Portuguese Communist Party). In general the Socialist Party lacked mass support, the trade union movement was led by anarchists and was not affiliated with the socialist International Federation of Trade Unions.

The party claimed a membership of 2,500 as of 1925. It published the biweekly Heraldo. It had an educational and workers' sport organization, with a membership of 3,000. The headquarters of the party were located at Alameda das Linhas de Torres, 34, Lisbon.

The party won two seats in the parliamentary elections of 1911, 1912, 1915 and 1925.

The party was a member of the Labour and Socialist International between March 1925 and 1933.

After the military coup of May 1926, the Socialist Party was the only tolerated political party. Initially the party adopted a passive tactic towards the military dictatorship. The party sharply distanced itself from the republic uprising in February 1927 (which had sought to reinstate the 1911 constitution). The national conference of 1930 decided that the party should openly cooperate with the government. One of the main leaders of the party at the time, Ramado Curto, was commissioned by the government to formulate a labour code. From 1930 he worked with the reformist trade unions in the corporativist National Economic Committee. After the establishment of Estado Novo by António de Oliveira Salazar in March 1933 the party was banned. The party responded by dissolving itself.

References

Banned socialist parties
Defunct socialist parties in Portugal
Political parties established in 1875
Political parties disestablished in 1933
Members of the Labour and Socialist International
1933 disestablishments in Portugal
1875 establishments in Portugal